Kim Myung-soo (born March 13, 1992), known professionally as L, is a South Korean singer, actor, and model. He debuted as a vocalist of boy band Infinite in 2010 and its sub-group Infinite F in 2014. He left Woollim Entertainment in August 2019 but is still a member of the group.

Early life
Kim Myungsoo was born on March 13, 1992, in Seoul, South Korea. He has a brother, Kim Moon-soo, who is two years younger than him. 
Kim attended Duk-soo High School and graduated from Daekyung University on February 15, 2013, majoring in practical music.

Career

2010–2016: Music and acting career
As a high school student, L auditioned for Woollim Entertainment after being street cast for his good looks. He was selected as the first member of idol group Infinite. He made his debut as a vocalist of the boy group in June 2010. In 2011, he made his acting debut in Japanese drama Jiu Keishicho Tokushuhan Sousagakari, which aired on TV Asahi in July. In 2012, he was cast in tvN's romance comedy series Flower Band, as a guitarist of a rock group. He was also cast in MBC's sitcom What's The Deal, Mom?

On May 15, 2013, L released a photo essay book titled L's Bravo Viewtiful, showing photos taken by him on a 93-day journey. In August 2013, he had a cameo in SBS's Master's Sun, playing the younger version of So Ji-sub's character.

In 2014, he was cast in supporting roles in MBC's Cunning Single Lady and SBS's My Lovely Girl.

With bandmates Sungyeol and Sungjong he comprised the subgroup Infinite F, which released a single album, Koi No Sign, in Japan on November 19, 2014, and a Korean album, Love Sign, in December 2014.

In 2015, he was cast in his first film Mister Shark, about a boy who befriends a shark.

In 2016, L was cast in the Korean-Chinese web drama My Catman. He also starred in the drama special The Day After We Broke Up, which was his first lead role.

2017–present: Rising popularity and military enlistment
In 2017, L starred in MBC's historical drama The Emperor: Owner of the Mask. His portrayal of a commoner who stands in for the king earned viewers' approval, and he was named Actor of the Month in June by MBC Dramanet.

In 2018, L starred in the legal drama Ms. Hammurabi portraying a judge. His performance in the series was well-received, earning him increased recognition.

In 2019, L starred in the fantasy romance drama Angel's Last Mission: Love.
In August 2019, L left Woollim.

In 2020, L starred in the fantasy romance drama Welcome as a cat who turns into a human male. In December 2020, L starred in historical comedy  Royal Secret Agent.

Before his enlistment, he released his debut single album Memory on February 3.  He also held an online fan meeting on February 20. While serving his military enlistment, it was announced on September 25, 2021 that L will make his musical theatre debut in the military musical Meisa's Song alongside EXO's Chanyeol, B.A.P.'s Daehyun and actor Moon Yong-suk.

On March 7, 2023, L signed a contract with Luke Media.

Personal life

Military enlistment 
On February 22, 2021, L enlisted for his mandatory military service as a member of the Republic of Korea Marine Corps. L was discharged on August 21, 2022. Later, on August 22, 2022, L posted on Instagram that he was discharged from military service.

Discography

Single albums

Singles

Songwriting and producing credits

Filmography

Television series

Web series

Hosting

Theater

Publication

Photobook

Awards and nominations

Notes

References

External links

 
 

1992 births
Infinite (group) members
Living people
Male actors from Seoul
Singers from Seoul
South Korean male idols
South Korean male film actors
South Korean male singers
South Korean male television actors
South Korean pop singers
South Korean male web series actors
Republic of Korea Marine Corps personnel